Silent Steeples is a 1996 album by American indie/roots folk band Dispatch. Unlike their future releases, the album contained mostly acoustic folk rock songs.

Track listing
"Steeples" (Urmston)
"Past the Falls" (Corrigan)
"Water Stop" (Heimbold)
"Hey, Hey" (Heimbold, Urmston, Corrigan)
"Flying Horses" (Urmston)
"Questioned Apocalypse" (Urmston)
"Seasons: Movement III" (Corrigan)
"Mayday" (Heimbold)
"Born Normal" (Urmston)
"Bridges (Strength in Numbers)" (Heimbold)
"Walk With You" (Corrigan)
"Elias" (Urmston)

Remastered version
A later release of the album with remastered tracks included the following songs after "Elias":

"Other Side" (Dispatch)
"Craze" (Dispatch)

Personnel
Chad Urmston - vocals (tracks 1-6, 8-10, 12), guitar (1, 4-6, 9, 12), percussion (1, 2)
Pete Heimbold - vocals (1-6, 8-10, 12), guitar (2, 3, 5, 8-10, 12), percussion (2)
Brad Corrigan - vocals (1-6, 8-12), guitar (1-3, 5, 6-8, 10-12), drums (1, 2, 8), percussion (2), harmonica (5)
Su Lian Tan - flute (7, 11)
Christian Teele - tabla (2), percussion (2, 5, 6, 12), drums (3, 5, 6, 9)
Leif Heimbold - bass guitar (1, 3, 5, 6, 9)
Mark Christensen - keyboard drone (2), harmonica (11)
Friends - crowd noise, ping pong (5)

References

External links

Dispatch albums
1996 debut albums